Queens Park Rangers Sports Club is a Grenadian football club based in St. George's. The club plays in the Grenada Premier Division. Queens Park Rangers is famous in Grenada as the only first division club to have never been relegated. The club is jointly tied for the most national titles, winning four, with their last title coming in 2002.

Honours
 GFA Premier League:
 Champions (6): 1976, 1982 1984, 1994, 1995, 2002
 Runners-up (3): 1996, 2001, 2006

References

External links
 Official Website

Queens Park